The Marand Khanate (Persian: خانات مرند) was an 18th–19th century khanate based in Marand. The khanate is known as one of the khanates, located in historic Azerbaijan, which remained semi-independent for 81 years.

The Khans of Marand
 Mohammadreza Khan Marandi 
 Nazarali Khan Marandi ? - 1828

References 

History of East Azerbaijan Province
Marand County
1747 establishments in Asia